Hugo Camps (12 May 1943 – 29 October 2022) was a Belgian journalist, columnist and writer. 

Camps published in both Belgian and Dutch magazines and wrote several books in particular about football and cycling. He worked for over thirty-five years for Elsevier Weekblad , for which he wrote a weekly interview and a column about sports until his death.

Camps died in Knokke on 29 October 2022, at the age of 79.

Awards and prizes
 1988 – Knight of the Order of Leopold II.
 2016 – Knight in the Order of Orange-Nassau. This was as a celebration of this 30th anniversary with Elsevier Weekblad. That day, in the presence of among others, the former Belgian Prime Minister Guy Verhofstadt, he was awarded this order by the Dutch ambassador to Belgium, Maryem van den Heuvel, during lunch at her residence in Brussels.

References

1943 births
2022 deaths
Belgian journalists
Belgian columnists
Belgian writers
People from Flemish Brabant
20th-century Belgian people